Izham bin Hashim is a Malaysian politician who has served as Member of the Selangor State Executive Council (EXCO) under Menteris Besar Amirudin Shari and Mohamed Azmin Ali as well as Member of the Selangor State Legislative Assembly (MLA) for Pandan Indah since May 2018. He is a member of the National Trust Party (AMANAH), a component party of the Pakatan Harapan (PH) state ruling but federal opposition coalition.

Election results

References 

Living people
People from Selangor
Malaysian people of Malay descent
 National Trust Party (Malaysia) politicians
21st-century Malaysian politicians
Year of birth missing (living people)
Members of the Selangor State Legislative Assembly
 Selangor state executive councillors